The 2017 Hampton Pirates football team represented Hampton University in the 2017 NCAA Division I FCS football season. They were led by fourth-year head coach Connell Maynor and played their home games at Armstrong Stadium. They were a member of the Mid-Eastern Athletic Conference (MEAC). They finished the season 6–5, 5–3 in MEAC play to finish in a tie for fourth place.

This was Hampton's final season as a member of the MEAC. On November 16, 2017, the school announced they would become a full member of the Big South Conference in 2018. Due to scheduling reasons, they were to remain in the MEAC for football in 2018. However, the MEAC refused to allow Hampton to remain in the conference, with no MEAC schools agreeing to play them, forcing the Pirates to become an FCS independent for 2018 before joining the Big South in 2019.

On November 20, 2017, head coach Connell Maynor resigned to become the head coach at Alabama A&M. He finished at Hampton with a four-year record of 20–25.

Schedule 

Source: Schedule

Game summaries

at Ohio

Delaware State

Livingstone

Monmouth

at Savannah State

at Norfolk State

Florida A&M

at Bethune–Cookman

North Carolina Central

at South Carolina State

Howard

References

Hampton
Hampton Pirates football seasons
Hampton Pirates football